Gaspar de Espinosa y Luna (Medina de Rioseco, Spain, c. 1484 - Cuzco, Peru, 14 February 1537) was a Spanish explorer, conquistador and politician. He participated in the expedition of Pedro Arias Dávila to Darién and was appointed mayor of Santa María la Antigua del Darién. He initiated proceedings against Vasco Núñez de Balboa and conquered part of current Costa Rica. After living some time in Spain, he returned to America to join Francisco Pizarro and Diego de Almagro in the conquest of the Inca Empire.

First years 
He was born into a family of merchants and bankers, whose business was to direct trade between Flanders and Castilla from Medina de Rioseco. Later settled in Seville, where trade with the Indies were allowed to increase his fortune. Later, his family founded a bank that soon became the benchmark for commercial activity that took place in the rest of Europe and also in the New World.

Travel to the Indies 
Already in middle age, he sailed for the Spanish and in 1513 was elected mayor of Castilla del Oro. A year later he formed part of the issuance of Pedrarias Dávila to Darién. Participated in the founding of the city of Panama (1519) and was appointed mayor of Santa María la Antigua del Darién. He led the expedition to the Pacific coast of Central America and was one of the architects of the discovery of the Gulf of Nicoya.

He led an expedition to Veragua with Hernando de Soto in 1520.

He returned to Spain, but soon became ruler of Santo Domingo and Panama, and returned to sail to America.

Finally, went to Peru where he financed with the help of his family, the expedition of Francisco Pizarro and Diego de Almagro, and tried, unsuccessfully, reconciliation between the two.

Espinosa's family was closely related to the court during the first half of the sixteenth century, it came as much of the funding for the expedition to the Moluccas conducted in 1525, and had previously provided funding for the conquest of Peru sufragrar.

References

1484 births
1537 deaths
16th-century Spanish people
Spanish conquistadors
Spanish explorers
Spanish politicians